Robot Hive / Exodus is the seventh full-length studio album by American rock band Clutch, released in 2005 on the DRT Entertainment label.

Album information
The original release of the album contained 14 tracks, though it had 15 on some editions, namely the single and title track of the compilation album, Slow Hole to China: Rare and Unreleased. It included two Blues covers, one by the legendary Howlin' Wolf and one by Mississippi Fred McDowell, continuing the band's musical virtuosity and their habit of playing various styles on their albums. Robot Hive/Exodus also signified the beginning of keyboard player Mick Schauer's time with the band. Schauer would also contribute to their next album, From Beale Street to Oblivion and subsequent tours.

A reissue of the album was released on September 28, 2010 with only the original 14 tracks, with a slightly different album cover design and an accompanying DVD of their performance at the "Sounds of the Underground" festival in July 2005.

In popular culture
The song "Mice and Gods" was used as the entrance music for DaMarques Johnson at UFC 112.
The song "10001110101" was featured in the video game Prey as a jukebox song.
The song "Burning Beard" was featured in the video game MX vs. ATV Reflex.

Track listing
All tracks written by Clutch, except where noted.

Track 15 is included as a bonus track on some editions of this album.

"What Would A Wookie Do?" and "Bottoms Up, Socrates" were both recorded during the Robot Hive/Exodus sessions but appear on the compilation album Pitchfork & Lost Needles, which is a reissue of the original EP's Clutch released in the '90s; Pitchfork and Passive Restraints, and these 2005 session out-takes.

Personnel

Neil Fallon – vocals, guitar, percussion
Tim Sult – guitar
Dan Maines – bass
Jean-Paul Gaster – drums, percussion
Mick Schauer – Hammond Organ, Hohner Clavinet, Wurlitzer Electric Piano

Production 
 Produced by Clutch and J. Robbins
 Recorded by J. Robbins at Bearsville Studios , Uncle Punchy Studios and the Magpie Gage
 Engineered by Chris Laidlaw and John Agnello at Bearsville Studios and Larry Packer at Uncle Punchy Studios
 Mixed by John Agnello and Assisted by Ted young at Water Music Records, Hoboken, New Jersey
Mastered by Allan Douchess at West West Studio
Art and layout by Nick Lakiotes for Six Point Harness

Charts

References

External links
Clutch's official website

2005 albums
Clutch (band) albums
DRT Entertainment albums
Gullah culture